Etwall is a civil parish in the South Derbyshire district of Derbyshire, England. The parish contains 16 listed buildings that are recorded in the National Heritage List for England. Of these, one is listed at Grade I, the highest of the three grades, two are at Grade II*, the middle grade, and the others are at Grade II, the lowest grade.  The parish contains the village of Etwall and the surrounding area, and all the listed buildings are in the village.  Most of them are houses and associated structures, and the others include a church, a group of almshouses and its gateway, a public house, and a well head.


Key

Buildings

References

Citations

Sources

 

Lists of listed buildings in Derbyshire